Volini is a pain relief medical spray manufactured, marketed and sold by Sun Pharma in India. The product was created by Ranbaxy Laboratories, but has been a part of Sun Pharma ever since Ranbaxy was acquired by the latter in 2014. The product's variant named Volini Maxx, was released on 29 August 2018.

Virat Kohli is the present brand ambassador of the product.

References

External links
Official website

Sun Pharma brands
Personal care brands